St. Andrew's School is a Scottish-heritage independent college preparatory school located on Wilmington Island in Savannah, Georgia, United States. It is a registered 501(c)3 non-profit organization. Established in 1978, it is dually accredited by Southern Association of Independent Schools and Southern Association of Colleges and Schools. The school serves students in Pre-K through 12th grade, and has several athletic and fine arts programs.

History 

St. Andrew's began when the Scottish heritage Independent Presbyterian Church of Savannah started a kindergarten for 4- to 5-year-olds in 1947. Over the course of a few decades, more grades were added. The first and only class graduated from the Independent Presbyterian Day School in 1978, and is considered to be St. Andrew's' first alumni, consisting of 10 students.

The school was relocated to Wilmington Island in November 1978 and a new campus was built. It included the Gus H. Bell Hall and the Compton Center. By 1979, the gymnasium was completed and the school's first basketball game was played. By 1986 a third building was opened, named Skinner Hall.

In 2002, the school purchased what is now the Johnson Early Childhood Center on Betz Creek. By 2005, St. Andrew's had turned into what it is now the Lower School Campus of the school. St. Andrew's is now composed of three separate campuses: one for lower school (Pre-K to 4th), another for middle school (5th to 8th), and one for high school (9th to 12th).

In 2011, Mark Toth became the sixth head of St. Andrew's, and by 2016, Kelley Waldron, the initial head of the lower school, was promoted as the seventh head.

Academics

Fine arts 
The school offers many fine arts courses, including:
 Band
 Strings
 Theatre
 Visual Arts
 Chorus

Foreign languages 
St. Andrew's offers three foreign language courses: Mandarin, Spanish, and French. It also has a Scottish historical background.

Athletics 
St. Andrew's offers many sports as part of their athletics program.
 Baseball
 Basketball
 Cheerleading
 Cross country (long-distance running)
 Football
 Soccer
 Swimming
 Tennis
 Track and field
 Weightlifting

Programs

International Baccalaureate 
St. Andrew's is an International Baccalaureate (IB) school, offering IB advanced classes in many fields of study.

Apple device program 
St. Andrew's currently distributes iPads to all students and teachers for use during the school year. It also allows students to check out MacBooks from its upper school library. Recently, it started a program that gave iPad Minis to its lower school and middle school students. Upper schoolers and teachers have also received MacBook Airs.

Because of these programs, St. Andrew's became an Apple Distinguished School in January 2013. Mark Toth said, "It is quite an honor to join a select class of institutions Apple is recognizing nationwide."

Affiliations 
St. Andrew's is currently affiliated with the following organizations:
 Southern Association of Independent Schools (SAIS)
 AdvancED (formerly SACS)
 National Association of Independent Schools (NAIS)
 Georgia Independent School Association (GISA)
 South Carolina Independent School Association (SCISA)

References

External links
 

Educational institutions established in 1978
Private high schools in Georgia (U.S. state)
Schools in Savannah, Georgia
Private middle schools in Georgia (U.S. state)
Private elementary schools in Georgia (U.S. state)
1978 establishments in Georgia (U.S. state)